This is a list of Illinois suffragists, suffrage groups and others associated with the cause of women's suffrage in Illinois.

Groups 

 Alpha Suffrage Club, formed in 1913.
Chicago Equal Suffrage Association, formerly the North Side Branch of IESA, created in 1910.
Chicago Political Equality League, formed in 1894.
Chicago Teachers' Federation.
Chicago Woman's Club.
Cook County Woman's Suffrage Society.
Decatur Women's Suffrage Club, formed in 1888.
Democratic Club of Chicago, formed in 1900.
Earlville Suffrage Association, formed in 1855.
Ella Flagg Young Club.
Illinois Equal Franchise Society.
Illinois Federation of Colored Women's Clubs.
Illinois Federation of Women's Clubs.
Illinois Woman Suffrage Association (IWSA), formed in 1869, later renamed Illinois Equal Suffrage Association (IESA).
Men's Equal Suffrage League, formed in 1909.
Naperville Equal Suffrage Club, created in 1888.
National Woman's Party.
The Ossoli Club, formed in Highland Park, Illinois, in 1894.
Sorosis.
Springfield Suffrage Association.
Women's Christian Temperance Union (WTCU) of Illinois.
Women's Trade Union League (WTUL).

Suffragists 

 Sadie Lewis Adams (Chicago).
Jane Addams.
Royal Allen.
Susan E. Allen (Galesburg).
Naomi Talbert Anderson (Chicago).
Susan Look Avery (Chicago).
Eugenia M. Bacon.
Anna Blount (Oak Park).
Elizabeth K. Booth (Glencoe).
Louise DeKoven Bowen (Chicago).
Myra Colby Bradwell.
Sophonisba Breckinridge (Chicago).
Virginia Brooks (Chicago).
Adella Maxwell Brown (Peoria).
Laura Robinson Campbell (East St. Louis)
Agnes Chase.
George E. Cole (Chicago).
Lydia Avery Coonley-Ward (Chicago).
Prudence Crandall.
Caroline Bartlett Crane (Chicago).
Gertrude Crocker (Hinsdale).
Ruth Crocker (Hinsdale).
Susan Lawrence Dana (Sangamon County).
Margaret Dobyne.
Kate N. Doggett (Chicago).
Elvira Downey (Clinton).
Ida Darling Engelke (Chicago).
Elizabeth Hawley Everett (Highland Park).
Lucy H. Ewing (Chicago).
Janet Kellogg Fairbank (Chicago).
Samuel Fallows (Chicago).
Clara M. Farson (St. Charles).
Henry B. Favill (Chicago).
Lucy Flower.
Antoinette Funk (Chicago).
Sophie Gibb (Decatur).
Catherine Goggin (Chicago).
Harriet Grim (Chicago).
Emily M. Gross.
Alonzo Jackson Grover (Earlville).
Elizabeth Boynton Harbert (Evanston).
Margaret Haley (Chicago).
Effie Henderson (Bloomington).
Mary Emma Holmes (Chicago)
Carrie S. Cook Horton (Chicago).
Kate Hughes (Table Grove).
Alta Hulett.
Adelaide Johnson.
Carrie Ashton Johnson (Rockford).
Jenkin Lloyd Jones (Chicago).
Mary H. Krout (Chicago).
Maydie Spaulding Lee (Springfield).
Lena Morrow Lewis (Chicago).
Mary Livermore.
Elizabeth F. Long (Barry).
Judith Weil Loewenthal (Chicago).
Andrew MacLeish (Chicago).
Anna A. Maley.
Ellen A. Martin (Lombard).
Mary Mather (Sangamon County).
Catharine Waugh McCulloch (Evanston).
Henry Neil (Chicago).
Agnes Nestor (Chicago).
Anna E. Nicholes.
S. Grace Nicholes (Chicago)
Maude Gregg Palmer (Springfield).
Fannie H. Rastall.
Harriet Reed (Springfield).
Susan Hoxie Richardson (Earlville).
Mabel Sippy (Chicago).
Julia Holmes Smith.
Eva Munson Smith.
Elmira E. Springer.
Belle Squire (Chicago).
Ida Staggall.
Ella S. Stewart.
Mary Thomas.
Helen Todd (Chicago).
Grace Wilbur Trout (Oak Park).
Elsie Unterman (Chicago).
Mary L. Walker.
Clara Barck Welles (Chicago).
Ida B. Wells (Chicago).
Frances Willard.
Fannie Barrier Williams (Chicago).
Jennie Willing (Rockford).

Politicians supporting women's suffrage 

 Martin B. Bailey.
Charles Bogardus.
James Bradwell.
Charles H. Carmon (Forrest).
Orrin N. Carter.
Miles B. Castle.
Albert C. Clark.
Michael H. Cleary.
William A. Compton.
Reuben W. Coon.
John M. Curran.
Edward C. Curtis.
George W. Curtis.
Samuel A. Ettelson.
Isaiah T. Greenacre.
George W. Harris.
Logan Hay.
Hugh S. Magill.
Walter Clyde Jones.
Kent E. Keller.
Walter I. Manny.
Medill McCormick.
Willard McEwen.
Thomas J. McMillan.
Fayette S. Munro (Highland Park).
Barratt O'Hara.
W. Duff Piercy.
Murray F. Tuley.
Richards S. Tuthill.
Emil N. Zolla (Chicago).

Places 

Leland Hotel (Springfield).
Pick-Congress Hotel (Chicago).

Publications 

 The Agitator, created in 1869.

Suffragists campaigning in Illinois 

 Susan B. Anthony.
Henry B. Blackwell.
Celia Burleigh.
Carrie Chapman Catt.
Miriam M. Cole.
Phoebe Couzins.
Emma Smith DeVoe.
Helen M. Gougar.
Mary Garrett Hay.
Isabella Beecher Hooker.
Julia Ward Howe.
Elizabeth A. Kingsbury.
Emmeline Pankhurst.
Lilly Peckham.
Mary Whitney Phelps.
Parker Pillsbury.
Anna Howard Shaw.
Ethel Snowden.
 Elizabeth Cady Stanton.
Lucy Stone.
Mabel Vernon.
Zerelda G. Wallace.

Anti-suffragists

Groups 

 Illinois Association Opposed to the Extension of Suffrage to Women, formed in 1897.

People 

 Anton J. Cermak (Chicago).
Caroline Fairfield Corbin (Chicago).
Levy Mayer (Chicago).
Emma Oglesby (Elkhart).

See also 

 Timeline of women's suffrage in Illinois
 Women's suffrage in Illinois
 Women's suffrage in states of the United States
 Women's suffrage in the United States

References

Sources

External links 
 All Citizens

Illinois suffrage

Illinois suffragists
Activists from Illinois
History of Illinois
Lists of people from Illinois